Silver Creek Township, Nebraska may refer to the following places:

Silver Creek Township, Burt County, Nebraska
Silver Creek Township, Merrick County, Nebraska

See also

Silvercreek Township, Dixon County, Nebraska
Silver Creek Township (disambiguation)

Nebraska township disambiguation pages